The Bell Food Group is the leading meat processor and manufacturer of convenience products in Switzerland. The company was founded in 1869 by Samuel Bell in Basel, where its headquarters is located up to now. Its range of products includes meat, poultry, charcuterie, seafood and convenience products. Brands include Bell, Abraham, ZIMBO, Môssieur Polette and Hilcona. The Bell Food Group has 65 locations in 15 European countries and employs 11,960 people, as of 2019.

History

On 29 March 1869, Samuel Bell-Roth (1840-1920) opened "Ochsenmetzg" (ox butchery) at Streitgasse 13 in Basel. The first store opened two decades later. The Samuel Bell Söhne company was founded in 1899 by Samuel Bell-Roth, Eduard Bell, Samuel Bell-Vollenweider and Rudolf Bell. It was converted into a stock corporation in 1907. In the same year, an area was acquired at Elsässerstrasse 174–188 in Basel, which still serves as the headquarters and production site today.

As early as 1912, Bell was the largest meat producer in Switzerland and one year later it entered into an alliance ("Bell Alliance") with what was then the Association of Swiss Consumers (now Coop).

In 2006, Bell entered into foreign markets, at first by exporting meat to Luxembourg, and later by acquiring French charcuterie manufacturer Polette, and German sausage manufacturer Abraham.

In 2018, Bell acquired the controlling stake in Swiss soup and sauce producer Hügli.

Organization

The headquarters of the Bell Food Group is in Basel, Switzerland. On July, 2019, the Bell Food Group was divided into three divisions: Bell Switzerland, Bell International, and Convenience and Services. The Bell International division is made up of Bell Germany, Bell Western/Eastern Europe and Hubers/Sütag divisions. The Convenience division comprises Eisberg, Hilcona and Hügli.

Around 8,000 employees generated consolidated sales of CHF 2.6 billion in the fiscal year 2014. Bell is listed on the SIX Swiss Exchange. The majority shareholder of Bell is Coop, one of Switzerland's largest retail and wholesale companies.

External links

References

Food and drink companies of Switzerland
Manufacturing companies based in Basel
Manufacturing companies established in 1869
Swiss companies established in 1869
Meat companies
Food and drink companies established in 1869
Companies listed on the SIX Swiss Exchange